Kiyoshi Adachi (Kanji:; born 30 June 1914, date of death unknown) was a Japanese pole vaulter. He competed in the 1936 Summer Olympics.

References

External links
 

1914 births
Year of death missing
Japanese male pole vaulters
Japanese male high jumpers
Olympic male pole vaulters
Olympic athletes of Japan
Athletes (track and field) at the 1936 Summer Olympics
Waseda University alumni
Japan Championships in Athletics winners
20th-century Japanese people